The first election for Lord Speaker was held on 28 June 2006 after the House of Lords had determined the title, powers and responsibilities of the office following removal of the speakership from the Lord Chancellor by the Constitutional Reform Act 2005.

Candidates
A list of nine candidates for election as the first Lord Speaker was announced on 6 June 2006:

 Lord Boston of Faversham (Crossbench)
 Lord Elton (Conservative)
 Baroness Fookes (Conservative)
 Lord Grenfell (non-affiliated)
 Baroness Hayman (Labour)
 Countess of Mar (Crossbench)
 Lord Richard (Labour)
 Lord Redesdale (Liberal Democrat)
 Viscount Ullswater (Conservative)

Result

The result of the election was announced on 4 July 2006, and Baroness Hayman immediately replaced the Lord Chancellor, Lord Falconer of Thoroton, on the Woolsack. The Lord Chamberlain, Lord Luce, was on hand to confirm the assent of the Queen to the election.

References

2006 elections in the United Kingdom
House of Lords
Lord Speaker elections